Sin Riendas (Eng.: Without Ties) is the title of a studio album released by norteño music group Bronco. This album became their third number-one set on the Billboard Top Latin Albums.

Track listing
The information from Billboard

CD track listing

Personnel
This information from Allmusic.
Manolo Díaz — Digital mastering
Alfonso Guzmán — Arranger
Manuel Herrara — Engineer
Hector Miranda — Engineer
David Eduardo Ruiz — Engineer
Homero Hernández — Art direction
Marco Carter — Graphic design

Chart performance

References

2004 albums
Grupo Bronco albums